Yervand Garsevanovich Sukiasyan (born on 20 January 1967 in Yerevan, Soviet Armenia) is a former Armenian professional football defender. He played in 35 international matches for the Armenia national team since his debut in 1994.

Sukiasyan finished his playing career with Kerkyra F.C. in the Greek Gamma Ethniki.

References

External links 
 
 
 
 

1967 births
Living people
Armenian footballers
Armenian expatriate footballers
Armenia international footballers
Soviet footballers
Soviet Top League players
Soviet Armenians
FC Ararat Yerevan players
Expatriate footballers in Ukraine
Armenian expatriate sportspeople in Ukraine
Armenian expatriate sportspeople in Greece
Armenian expatriate sportspeople in Austria
Armenian expatriate sportspeople in Germany
FC Dynamo Kyiv players
FC Arsenal Kyiv players
Expatriate footballers in Greece
Iraklis Thessaloniki F.C. players
Kavala F.C. players
A.O. Kerkyra players
Super League Greece players
Ukrainian Premier League players
Ukrainian First League players
Ukrainian Second League players
Expatriate footballers in Austria
Expatriate footballers in Germany
Footballers from Yerevan
Association football defenders